Special Source Operations (SSO) is a division in the US National Security Agency (NSA) which is responsible for all programs aimed at collecting data from major fiber-optic cables and switches, both inside the US and abroad, and also through corporate partnerships. Its existence was revealed through documents provided by Edward Snowden to media outlets in 2013 and, according to him, it is the "crown jewel" of the NSA.

History

The program began in 2006, according to one of Snowden's documents, when the NSA was collecting the equivalent of "one Library of Congress every 14.4 seconds". The Washington Post described the official seal of the SSO division as something "that might have been parody: an eagle with all the world's cables in its grasp."

Notable programs

The five biggest collection programs of the Special Source Operations division are codenamed:
 DANCINGOASIS
 SPINNERET
 MOONLIGHTPATH
 INCENSER
 AZUREPHOENIX

Other known programs include:
 PRISM – front-door collection using Foreign Intelligence Surveillance Act (FISA) orders
 MUSCULAR – back-door collection from Google and Yahoo private clouds
 Upstream collection – which includes:
 FAIRVIEW
 BLARNEY
 STORMBREW
 OAKSTAR

See also 
 Special Collection Service
 Tailored Access Operations

References

External links 
 INCENSER, or how NSA and GCHQ are tapping internet cables
 NSA's largest cable tapping program: DANCINGOASIS

National Security Agency